Damiano David  (born 8 January 1999) is an Italian singer. He is the frontman of the rock band Måneskin, which won the Sanremo Music Festival 2021 and subsequently the Eurovision Song Contest 2021 representing Italy with the song "Zitti e buoni".

Career 
David was born in Rome to Daniele David and Rosa Scognamiglio, both flight attendants. Due to the nature of his parents' work, he and his older brother Jacopo travelled worldwide from an early age, introducing them to various cultures. Until he was 17, he showed some talent playing basketball as a point guard at the local club Eurobasket Roma. He recalls that the basketball experience gave him fundamental discipline to succeed in his life.

David started singing when he was six years old. He met Victoria De Angelis and Thomas Raggi, who he would eventually go on to form Måneskin with, during his high school days. He studied at the liceo linguistico Eugenio Montale in Rome, but he did not complete high school and instead devoted himself to his music career, for which he had the support of his parents. When introduced for the position of a vocalist for their local band, he was initially rejected because his style was considered "too pop", but his insistence to be in the band eventually got him accepted. David soon changed his demeanor and style, especially his stage persona, because he learned how to freely express himself. The band was formed in 2016 and initially played as buskers in the streets of the city of Rome, but in 2017 they soon rose to prominence when they finished second in the eleventh season of the Italian talent show X Factor. The band had a breakthrough debut with the studio album Il ballo della vita and tour in 2018 and 2019. In 2021, their second studio album Teatro d'ira: Vol. I was released.

After their victory at the Eurovision Song Contest 2021 he was falsely accused of drug use during the final. David says that he has never used hard drugs and, along with his bandmates, is an anti-drug advocate. David himself stated in his Vogue Italia interview, "we are not falling into the stereotype of the alcoholic and drugged rock star". He states that he only drinks alcohol on special events. He believes that creativity comes from a "healthy, trained and lucid" mind and it is contradicting trying to truly express "our own self by binding ourselves to something that instead makes us dependent, slaves", also referring to the 27 Club.

David sang a cover version of the song "I Wanna Be Your Dog", by the Stooges, as well as voicing the character of Jeffrey, assistant of the main antagonist, for the Italian dub of the 2021 film Cruella.

Music style 
A part of the band's success has been connected to David's vocal performance, stage look and personality. In 2017 X-factor judge Fedez commented that David is a real frontman. In 2021 Manuel Agnelli praised him in similar words to have a "natural charisma of the great frontmen". His vocal style in 2017 was described as having a "reggae vocal timbre that allows him to masterfully deal with the rock repertoire, given that the band's musical influences range from indie rock to soul to pop". His characteristic androgynous look and fashion style on stage is seen as a mixture of hippie, vintage, and glam rock from the 1970s, because of which, he has been labeled an Italian fashion icon.

Filmography

Personal life 
David has been in a relationship with Italian model and influencer Giorgia Soleri for approximately five years.

In addition to Italian, David is fluent in English and can speak some Spanish and French. He is an advocate for racial and LGBT rights. David said he is against drugs and that he never consumed them, stating: "Creativity comes from a healthy, trained, lucid mind. The brain is a machine that has to have its gears in place and drugs are just a huge filth … The message we want to spread with our music is the exaltation of man through his freedom, and how could we talk about the expression of his own self by binding ourselves to something that instead makes us dependent, slaves?". He is also a fan of association football club A.S. Roma.

David is fond of the symbolism of the Greek mythological character, Icarus, having a tattoo of wings and a quote referring to Icarus on his hip, as well as "Ykaaar" as his username on the social media platform Instagram.

References

External links 

 
 
 

1999 births
Alternative rock singers
Eurovision Song Contest winners
Sanremo Music Festival winners
21st-century Italian male singers
Italian male singer-songwriters
Italian rock singers
Living people
Singers from Rome
Måneskin members
Glam rock musicians